The 1901 Dartmouth football team was an American football team that represented Dartmouth College as an independent during the 1901 college football season. The team played its home games at the Alumni Oval in Hanover, New Hampshire.

Schedule

References

Dartmouth
Dartmouth Big Green football seasons
Dartmouth football